Francis Emritz Hamabe (1917 — 2002) was an American artist of Japanese and Swedish descent. He mainly worked in the state of Maine.

Known best for his screen printing, oil painting and Sumi ink drawing, he also cartooned, including for The New Yorker and The Philadelphia Inquirer, and produced murals. He was the first art instructor for the Farnsworth Art Museum and the first art director of Down East, The Magazine of Maine. In 1952 he co-founded the Maine Coast Artists cooperative (later the Center for Maine Contemporary Art) with Denny Winters, William and Stell Shevis, William Thon, Mildred Burrage and William Kienbusch.

Hamabe lived briefly in Rockport, Maine before settling for a time in Blue Hill, Maine. He taught at the Blue Hill Consolidated School, the University of Maine at Orono and the University of Maine at Machias.

References

External links 

 Works from the estate of Francis Hamabe 
 Articles from The Ellsworth American:
 Obituary, with picture in-life
 Blue Hill School’s Celebration of Puppetry Dedicated to “Mr. Puppetman” Hamabe

1917 births
2002 deaths
Artists from Maine
People from Bristol, Rhode Island
People from Orange, New Jersey
University of Maine faculty
University of Maine at Machias faculty
People from Blue Hill, Maine
20th-century American painters
American male painters
20th-century American male artists